Charles Howland-William H. Chase House is a historic home located at Union Springs in Cayuga County, New York.  It was built about 1840 and is a remarkably intact two-story, five-bay, center-hall limestone dwelling in the Greek Revival style.  Attached to the main block is a large two-story rear wing creating an L-shaped house.  Also on the property is a stone barn, stone shed, and stone smokehouse.

It was listed on the National Register of Historic Places in 2005.

The house is set back from Cayuga Street (New York State Route 90).

References

External links

Houses on the National Register of Historic Places in New York (state)
Greek Revival houses in New York (state)
Houses completed in 1840
Houses in Cayuga County, New York
National Register of Historic Places in Cayuga County, New York
Union Springs, New York